Koath is a notified area in Rohtas district in the Indian state of Bihar.

 Here is the residence of the well-known Bilgrami family, descendants of Nawab Syed Nurul Hasan Khan, who came from the family home at Bilgram in Oudh after peace had been concluded with Shuja-ud-daula in the battle of Buxar (1764), when he received a large zamindari at Shahabad with annual revenue amounting 2 lakhs. Most of this was lost at the time of the permanent settlement. Consequently, he was left in possession of his malikana villages, some 152 in numbers, and the rest of the zamindari was settled with the farmers who were in possession.

Geography
It has an average elevation of 73 metres (239 feet).

Koath is far from main highway only approx 3.5 kilometer, Since 1927 it is study center up to high school for local area.

Demographics
 India census, Koath had a population of 20,809. Males constitute 52% of the population and females 48%. Koath has an average literacy rate of 48%, lower than the national average of 59.5%: male literacy is 59%, and female literacy is 36%. In Koath, 19% of the population is under 6 years of age.

History

A report of 1955-56 AND 1956-57.

Prof. S.H. Askari, Mr. F. Balkhi and Mr. Qeyamuddin Ahmad visited Koath (Dist. Shahabad) to inspect valuable collection of Persian manuscripts belonging to Syed Abu Mohammad Bilgrami. The collection was a very big and valuable one.

A brief descriptive list of some of the manuscripts is given below.

1.         Masnavi Shoris-i-Ishq and Samar-i-Murad and Dewan of Mr Imami Bilgrami, dated 1263 Fasli (1856).

2.         Zadul-Akhirat (Urdu) by Mir Md. Hadi, a contemporary of Sher Ali Afsos.

3.         Diwan-i-Nusrat (Persian), dated 1177.

4.         Volume containing (1) Alif-i-Kasrat, (2) Dastural Amal Wasaiq, (3) Resala Namaz, (4) Resala Anwar-i-Hikmat, (5) Dur-i-Bebaha, (6) Ilm-i-Tasawidiuf, (7) Rauzatul-Waizin, (8) Doha Bhat. (9) Majmaul Masadir, (10) Ruqaate-Alamgir, (11) Munazirab Dukhtari Shah Rum, (12) Sharah Sikandar Nama, (13) Irshad-ut-Talibin, (14) Hasanat-ul-Arifin.

5.         Tuhfat-ul-Ahrar An old and authentic copy, dated 1998 A.H.

6.         Manshaat-i-Jalal Khan Kakar- Some of the letters refer to Patna and Bihar.

7.         Biaz Ashar Mutafarreqat (Urdu).

8.         Diwan-i-Md. Tahir Alvi written in 46th years of Aurangzib.

9.         Masnavi Nal Daman by Faizi, copy dated 1090 A.H.

10.       Sharah nuzhat-ul-Arwab by S. Abdul Wahid Bilgrami also Sharah Kalam Ibn-i-Hajib in the same volume.

11.       Diwan Mir Khadim Ali, Gulshan, Jaunpur, dated 1206 A.H.

12.       Insha-i-Yusuf, a valuable work containing copy of letters of the authors.

13.       Diwan-i-Baligh- Poetical work of Baligh, rare (incomplete).

14.       Dah Majlish (Urdu) by Muhsin, rare.

15.       Diwan-i-Fashihi (Persian) very old and rare.

16.       Rubiyat-i-Dard (Persian) rare.

17.       Diwan-i-Ghalib (Urdu) dated 1254 A.H. Volume also contains Diwan-i-Ahqar Maraharavi. slightly wormeaten.

18.       Risala-Manasik-i-Haj, dated 1175. Illustrated and beautifully written in verse.

19.       Bayan-i-Waqe by Hazrat Md. Mir, dated 1219 A.H.

20.       Kashkaul contains specimens of Persian Poetry and extracts from biographical work of Azad Bilgrami.

21.       Qissa-i-Husn-o-Ishq (Urdu) by Shah Hasan.

22.       Diwan-i-Kashifi, dated 1107 A.H. Persian.

23.       Rawayaul Bayan or Tazkirat-Zangishah. Written in 1156. Authentic and rare copy, (Probably autograph). Pages loose and somewhat damaged.

24.       Volume containing (a) Yasuf Zulekha of Jami, (b) Laila Majmn (c) Salamanwa Ahsal- Copy, dated 965 A.H., very beautifully written with golden marginal lines.

25.       Tuhfat-ul-Majalis-Malfuzat of H. Shakh Ahmad Maghrebi, rare.

26.       Anisut-Tahqiq –A rare and valuable work on Sufism.

27.       Anisut-Tahqiq –A rare and valuable work on Sufism. Volume also contains a falnamsh and author MSS on Insha, somewhat damaged.

28.       Farhang-i-Bostan by Mulla Md. Saad Azimabadi, dated 1190 A.H. Very few copies of this are known to exist, somewhat damaged.

29.       Masnaviat Allama by Abdul Jalil Bilgrami, authentic copy.

30.       Volume containing Ruqaat-i-Allamgir and Inshai Chandar Bhan, dated 1117 A.H.

31.       Diwan-i-Khalis (Persian), dated 1181 A.H. Said to be the poetical works of Imteaz Khan Khalis, father of Mir Qasim.

32.       Diwan-i-Bezan (Persian) rare.

33.       Diwan-i-Soz (Urdu). Very few copies of this are known to exist.

34.       Masnavi-meher-o-Mushtari by Maulana Isar Tabrezi. Very old and rare.

35.       Makhub Mir Ashraf Jahangir, letters of the famous 14th century Saint of Kuchhawchha. Contains some valuable informations about the period and also about his contemporaries.

36.       Maadan-ul-Jawahir.

37.       Diwan-i-Dard. Poetical works of famous Urdu poet of Delhi in the 18th century.

38.       Dastur-ul-Amal.

39.       Haqaiqul Asrar.

40.       Awarif-i-Hindi

41.       Masnavi Zenat.

42.       Majmua-i-Intekhab-i-Diwan Selection of poetries of famous Persian poet.

43.       Ketab-i-Insha.

44.       Badai-ul-Insha by Yusufi – A valuable work on the mode of addressing letters etc., to persons of Rank as in vogue during Mughal Rule.

45.       Tazkira-i-Qadria.

46.       Kimya-i-Saadat. A well-known work of the famous philosopher, All Ghazzali.

47.       Hulyat-ul-Muttaqin.

48.       Maarijul-Ulum.

49.       Tazkira-i-Sarkhush.

50.       Rasal-i-Nematullah.

51.       Reaz-un-Naem.

52.       Shoresh-i-Ishq.

53.       Beyan-Qasaid.

54.       Diwan-i-Kamal.

55.       Diwan-i-Maghabir.

56.       Reazush Shuaara.

57.       Gul-e-Raana.

58.       Majmua-i-Qasaid.

59.       Kullequt-i-Sauda.

60.       Dewan

61.       Padmavat.

62.       Beaz-i-Ashaar

63.       Taadibuz Zindiq.

64.       Anjuman-i- Bedil.

65.       Dewan-i-Abli Sherazi.

66.       Dastur-i-?

67.       Saqi Nama,

68.       Masnavi Furrukhsiyar.

69.       Beaz

70.       Beaz Anis-i-Tanhai.

71.       Beaz Ashaar.

72.       Dewan-i-Waheed.

73.       Dewan-i-Ibn-i-Yamin.

74.       Akhluq-i-Mohsini – A well-known literary Persian work by Hiusain Kashifi.

75.       Dastur-ul-Amal.

They also visited at Koath the collections of Mr. Syed Nabi. This collection, although not so large as the other one, contains some very important and rare manuscripts, including a copy of the Tarikh-i-Bashidi, and also a copy of the Shah Nama, which is older than the copy available in the Oriental Public Library

References

Cities and towns in Rohtas district